John Morton Parker (born 21 February 1951) is a former New Zealand international cricketer who played first-class cricket between 1971 and 1984. He captained New Zealand in the third Test against Pakistan in 1976/77.

Parker played cricket in England when young, and helped Imran Khan at this time. He was the youngest of three brothers to play first-class cricket, the other two being Kenneth and Murray Parker.

He played 36 Test matches and 24 One Day International for New Zealand. Parker scored three Test hundreds and 21 first-class hundreds in a career that spanned 14 years.

References

External links 

 

1951 births
Living people
Cricketers at the 1975 Cricket World Cup
Cricketers from Dannevirke
New Zealand cricketers
New Zealand One Day International cricketers
New Zealand Test cricket captains
New Zealand Test cricketers
Northern Districts cricketers
Worcestershire cricketers